Olly Holzmann (1915–1995) was an Austrian dancer and film actress. During the Second World War years, she appeared in films made by Wien-Film.

Selected filmography
 Hotel Sacher (1939)
 A Mother's Love (1939)
 Woman in the River (1939)
 My Aunt, Your Aunt (1939)
 Vienna Tales (1940)
 Seven Years Hard Luck (1940)
 The White Dream (1943)
 In the Temple of Venus (1948)

References

Bibliography 
 Robert von Dassanowsky. Austrian Cinema: A History. McFarland, 2005.

External links 
 

1915 births
1995 deaths
Austrian film actresses
Dancers from Vienna
Actresses from Vienna